Cnesteboda davidsoni is a moth of the family Tortricidae. It is found in Taiwan.

Adults are on wing in mid-May.

References

Tortricini
Moths of Taiwan
Moths described in 2000
Taxa named by Józef Razowski